There are a small number of Iranians in Pakistan, the vast majority of whom live in Karachi and Lahore. Most are students, while others are political asylum seekers, of which the latter are mostly Iranian Baloch.

Community
In Karachi, there are several Iranian restaurants, known as "Iranian cafes", which are run by Iranian families. They speak Persian.

Notable people
Notable Pakistani people of Iranian descent include:
Aga Khan III
Nusrat Bhutto, of Kurdish Descent and wife of Zulfiqar Ali Bhutto
Benazir Bhutto served as the 11th and 13th Prime Minister of Pakistan
Lady Abdullah Haroon
Muhammad Ali Shahki
Abul Hassan Ispahani
Asghar Ali Ispahani 
Nahid Mirza – wife of Iskander Mirza

See also 
Iran–Pakistan relations
Pakistanis in Iran

References

External links
Iranians face threat in Pakistan - Daily Times
Iranians protest in Pakistan - Maktoob News

 
Ethnic groups in Pakistan